Girolamo Candido, O.F.M. (died 1504) was a Roman Catholic prelate who served as Bishop of Cariati e Cerenzia (1500–1504).

Biography
Girolamo Candido was ordained a priest in the Order of Friars Minor.
On 20 Nov 1500, he was appointed during the papacy of Pope Alexander VI as Bishop of Cariati e Cerenzia.
He served as Bishop of Cariati e Cerenzia until his death on 1504.

See also 
Catholic Church in Italy

References

External links and additional sources
 (for Chronology of Bishops) 
 (for Chronology of Bishops) 

16th-century Italian Roman Catholic bishops
Bishops appointed by Pope Alexander VI
1504 deaths
Franciscan bishops